Claudia Schramm (born 14 June 1975 in Bad Langensalza) is a German bobsledder who has competed since 2000. She won a bronze in the two-woman event at the 2008 FIBT World Championships in Altenberg, Germany.

Schramm finished seventh in the two-woman event at the 2010 Winter Olympics in Vancouver.

References
 

1975 births
Bobsledders at the 2010 Winter Olympics
German female bobsledders
Living people
Olympic bobsledders of Germany
People from Bad Langensalza
Sportspeople from Thuringia
21st-century German women